Piano Sonata in F-sharp major may refer to:

 Piano Sonata No. 24 (Beethoven)
 Piano Sonata No. 4 (Scriabin)